First World Manifesto is the twelfth full-length studio album by the American punk rock band Screeching Weasel. It was released on March 15, 2011, on Fat Wreck Chords and is the band's first album in eleven years.  It was produced by Mike Kennerty of The All-American Rejects, who has worked with Ben Weasel before on These Ones Are Bitter in 2007.

On February 10, 2011, "Beginningless Vacation" premiered on spin.com as a free download.

Track listing
All songs written by Ben Weasel, except "Dry Is the Desert" written by Ben Weasel & Dan Vapid.
"Follow Your Leaders" - 2:06
"Frankengirl" - 1:50
"Beginningless Vacation" - 2:20
"Dry Is the Desert" - 2:44
"Totem Pole" - 2:04
"Creepy Crawl" - 2:02
"Three Lonely Days" - 2:43
"Friday Night Nation" - 2:06
"All Over Town" - 2:29
"Fortune Cookie" - 2:13
"Baby Talk" - 2:17
"Come and See the Violence Inherent in the System" - 2:02
"Bite Marks" - 1:29
"Little Big Man" - 2:40

Personnel
 Ben Weasel - lead vocals
 Dan Vapid - guitar, vocals
 Drew Fredrichsen - guitar
 Justin Perkins - bass
 Adam Cargin - drums 
 Dr. Frank - additional vocals on "Frankengirl"
 Joe King - additional vocals on "Creepy Crawl"
 Teakettle Jones - keyboards

References

Screeching Weasel albums
2011 albums
Fat Wreck Chords albums